Virgil Popescu (1916–1989) was a Romanian footballer and later coach. In Yugoslavia, he was known as Stanislav Popesku.

Career
He was born in 1916 during the First World War, in the Transylvanian town of Zlatna, back then within Austro-Hungary, nowadays in Romania.  In 1918, at the end of the war, his parents moved to the newly formed Kingdom of Serbs, Croats and Slovenes, later renamed Yugoslavia. He began playing for Novi Sad club FK Vojvodina and was part of Vojvodina's so called Millionaires team at the beginning of the 1940s.  He played with Vojvodina in the Novi Sad subassociation league in the 1938–39 season  and then in the Serbian League between 1939 and 1941.

The Second World War started in Yugoslavia in 1941. Popescu was at the time attending the Commercial Academy in Belgrade, and by 6 April 1941, he was a second lieutenant defending the country against German forces.  It took four days, on 10 April, when he was captured by Axis forces near Belgrade and taken to Romania to a concentration camp in Turnu Măgurele. After spending two years in the camp, in 1943 he caught the attention of Juventus Bucharest boss Cezar Popescu who got the news that this 27-year-old defender who had played in Serbia was in the camp 8. By explaining how Virgil Popescu was a Romanian and as such a German ally, he managed to release him from the camp and brought him to the team. He made his debut for Bucharest side Juventus on 6 October, in a match against Craiova. He made 7 appearances for Juventus in the 1943–44 Romanian Divizia A.  However, not very long afterwards he entered the club offices and said that he had to leave to fight alongside Yugoslav Partisans and Marshal Tito in freeing Yugoslavia, and club officials accepted his will, so he returned to Yugoslavia and joined the resistance.

He fought the Germans, and at the end of the war, in 1945, he was among the founders of Belgrade-based FK Partizan which became one of the major powers of Yugoslav football. His passion for Serbia was such that he adopted a Serbian name, Stanislav.  He played with Partizan in the Yugoslav First League for two seasons.  He played a total of 65 matches and scored once for Partizan, of which 17 matches were in the league.  Earlier, he played with SAP Vojvodina in the 1945 Yugoslav Football Tournament.  With Partizan he won the first Yugoslav post-World War II championship.

He later became a coach.  He coached Miroslav Blažević at NK Rijeka in the Yugoslav First League. and was the assistant manager to Abdulah Gegić at Partizan when they reached the 1966 European Cup Final. He also coached Polish side Legia Warsaw in the season 1964–65. Popescu then managed Swiss team St. Gallen and Wormatia Worms in Germany before moving to Morocco and Algeria to help develop football in those countries, there he coached the Moroccan Olympic side and KAC Kénitra. In the 1972–73 season, he was at the helm of Algerian side JS Kabylie, with whom he won the championship.

Honours
Player
Vojvodina
Novi Sad subassociation league: 1939, 1940
Partizan
Yugoslav First League: 1946–47
Yugoslav Cup: 1947

Manager
Legia Warsaw
Polish Cup: 1964
JS Kabylie
Algerian League: 1972–73

References

1916 births
1989 deaths
People from Zlatna
People from the Kingdom of Hungary
Romanian footballers
Yugoslav footballers
Association football defenders
FK Vojvodina players
FK Partizan players
Yugoslav First League players
Romanian expatriate footballers
Expatriate footballers in Yugoslavia
FC Petrolul Ploiești players
Romanian football managers
Yugoslav football managers
HNK Rijeka managers
FC St. Gallen managers
Wormatia Worms managers
JS Kabylie managers
Romanian expatriate football managers
Romanian expatriate sportspeople in Morocco
Romanian expatriate sportspeople in Algeria
Romanian expatriate sportspeople in Poland
Romanian expatriate sportspeople in Switzerland
Romanian expatriate sportspeople in Yugoslavia
Expatriate football managers in Yugoslavia
Expatriate football managers in Poland
Expatriate football managers in Switzerland
Expatriate football managers in Germany
Expatriate football managers in Morocco
Expatriate football managers in Algeria
Legia Warsaw managers
FK Partizan non-playing staff
KAC Kénitra managers